Kani Sanjud (also Romanized as Kānī Sanjūd) is a village in Mahmudabad Rural District, in the Central District of Shahin Dezh County, West Azerbaijan Province, Iran. At the 2006 census, its population was 40, in 8 families.

References 

Populated places in Shahin Dezh County